Cezar Bolliac or Boliac, Boliak (March 23, 1813 – February 25, 1881) was a Wallachian and Romanian radical political figure, amateur archaeologist, journalist and Romantic poet.

Life

Early life
Born in Bucharest as the son of Anton Bogliako (Bogliacco or Bolliac), a Greek-Italian physician, and his wife Zinca Pereţ, who remarried the stolnic Petrache Pereţ; his adoptive father took care of Cezar's education. After being taught reading and writing at home, Bolliac studied at the Saint Sava Academy, under Ion Heliade Rădulescu - Rădulescu was to become one of his most important collaborators.

In 1830, he joined the newly refounded Wallachian Army as a member of its officer corps. Three years later, Bolliac became a member of the secret Philharmonic Society, created by Ion Câmpineanu, Rădulescu, and Constantin Aristia.

In 1835, he published his first lyrical works. A year later, he began editing the review Curiosul.

Frăţia and manifestos
With fellow radicals Nicolae Bălcescu and Eftimie Murgu, Bolliac joined in Mitică Filipescu's conspiracy against Prince Alexandru II Ghica and, later in the year, entered the Freemasonry-inspired Frăţia ("Brotherhood") secret society.

In 1844, through the means of Foaie pentru minte, inimă şi literatură, he appealed to young writers:
"The times of Petrarch are over, gentlemen poets! The century demands progress, propaganda for the great idea, propaganda for the true charity that we lack entirely. (...) Form societies, declare, write down, praise, satirise, start working with all intellectual and moral devices, and the enslavement shall crumble, for it is half-crumbled, and you gentlemen shall be given the blessings of future generations as true apostles of the heavenly mission, of brotherhood and freedom."

In an article he published in 1846 in the pages of the same magazine, Bolliac showed his admiration for the works and attitudes of Victor Hugo, which he recommended as a guide to Wallachian writers.

Revolution and later life
Consequently, he was one of the leaders of the 1848 Wallachian revolution, and took exile after the Ottoman-Russian intervention in September. In Braşov, Transylvania (on Austrian domain), Bolliac began publishing Espatriatul, a paper which featured the subtitle Dreptate, Frăţie ("Justice, Brotherhood"), a rendition of the revolutionary slogan. After 1857, he settled in Paris, and published the French-language poem Domnul Tudor. Episode de la révolution roumaine de 1821 ("Voivode Tudor. An Episode of the 1821 Romanian Revolution"), and began issuing his review Buciumul, a mainly political magazine.

He returned to Wallachia in 1858, after the Crimean War had led to a drastic decrease in Russian influence (allowing for radicals to regin their country), and took an archaeological study trip. He included the results of his investigations in Buciumul and its successor Trompeta Carpaţilor (he began editing the latter in 1865). During the period, Bolliac also engaged in activism in favor of Wallachia's union with Moldavia, a goal reached under Alexandru Ioan Cuza. He later became a notorious antisemite, rejected the idea of naturalization for the Jews, and engaged in a polemic over this issue (and that of his version of Romanticism in general) with Junimea'''s Titu Maiorescu.

He died in Bucharest, by then the capital of the Kingdom of Romania.

Published volumesOperile lui Cezar Boliac. Meditaţii ("The Works of Cezar Boliac. Musings", 1835)Din poeziile lui Kesar Boliak ("Selected Poems of Kesar Boliak", 1843)Poezii nouă ("New Poems", 1847)Poezii umanitare ("Humanitarian Poems", 1866)

Notes

References
Z. Ornea, Anii treizeci. Extrema dreaptă românească'', Ed. Fundaţiei Culturale Române, Bucharest, 1995

1813 births
1881 deaths
Romanian archaeologists
Romanian people of Greek descent
Writers from Bucharest
People of the Revolutions of 1848
Romanian essayists
19th-century Romanian historians
Romanian magazine editors
19th-century Romanian poets
Romanian male poets
Romanian revolutionaries
Romantic poets
19th-century journalists
Male journalists
Male essayists
19th-century essayists
19th-century male writers